The Astra-Paulhan flying boat was designed and built in the latter stages of WWI and was tested at the Marine Nationale seaplane base at Saint-Raphaël, Var in 1919. No information is available other than it was a biplane with twin fuselages between the wings and a central flying boat hull suspended from the lower wing, powered by two water-cooled engines in the noses of the fuselages.

Specifications

References

1910s French patrol aircraft
Flying boats
Biplanes
Single-engined pusher aircraft
Astra aircraft
Aircraft first flown in 1919